Christine Paulin-Mohring (born 1962) is a mathematical logician and computer scientist, and Professor Faculté des Sciences at Paris-Saclay University, best known for developing the interactive theorem prover Coq.

Biography 
Paulin-Mohring received her PhD in 1989 under the supervision of Gérard Huet.  She has been a professor at Paris-Saclay University since 1997 and the dean of the Paris-Saclay Faculty of Sciences since 2016.

Between 2012 and 2015, she was the Scientific Coordinator of the Labex DigiCosme. Currently, she is a member of the editorial board of the Journal of Formalized Reasoning.

Recognition

She and the rest of the Coq development team (Thierry Coquand, Gérard Huet, Bruno Barras, Jean-Christophe Filliâtre, Hugo Herbelin, Chetan Murthy, Yves Bertot and Pierre Castéran) won the 2013 ACM Software System Award awarded by the Association for Computing Machinery.

She was elected to the Academia Europaea in 2014.

Further reading 

 Lecture Notes in Computer Science. Types for Proofs and Programs: International Workshop TYPES'96, Aussois, France, 15–19 December 1996 Selected Papers; Eduardo Gimenez, Christine Paulin-Mohring, Springer 
 Types for Proofs and Programs: International Workshop, TYPES 2004, Jouy-en-Josas, France, 15–18 December 2004, Revised Selected Papers: 3839 (Lecture Notes in Computer Science); Jean-Christophe Filliatre, Christine Paulin-Mohring, Benjamin Werner, Springer, 2008
 Interactive Theorem Proving: 4th International Conference, ITP 2013, Rennes, France, 22–26 July 2013, Proceedings (Lecture Notes in Computer Science); Sandrine Blazy, Christine Paulin-Mohring, David Pichardie, Springer, 2013

References

External links 
 Home page at LRI
 

Living people
Mathematical logicians
Women logicians
21st-century French mathematicians
20th-century French mathematicians
French computer scientists
French women computer scientists
20th-century women mathematicians
1962 births
21st-century women mathematicians
Paris-Saclay University people
Members of Academia Europaea
20th-century French women
21st-century French women